China Marine Surveillance (CMS) was a maritime surveillance agency of China.

Patrol vessels from China Marine Surveillance are commonly deployed to locations in the South China Sea and East China Sea where China has territorial disputes over islands with its neighbors. The CMS has played a central role in China's increasing assertiveness in the South China Sea, encountering opposition from Japan, the Philippines and Vietnam in the disputed territories, as China tries to lock up natural resources to meet its demands as the world's largest energy consumer.

One senior US naval intelligence officer has suggested that the mission of China Marine Surveillance is to "harass other nations into submitting to China's expansive claims."

The agency has been disbanded in July 2013 and has now been merged, along with three other similar agencies, with the China Coast Guard.

Organization and function 
Established 1998, the CMS, charged with the supervisory responsibility for some 3 million square kilometers of Chinese declared territorial waters, employs some 7,000 individuals and operates some 10 aircraft, including at least one Mil Mi-8 helicopter and two Harbin Y-12 utility planes, and 400 seagoing vessels.(Two Harbin Y-12 aircraft seen at Guilin airfield on a number of occasions in August 2013.) It has grown in fleet size and capability. Its fleet is made up of, in part, destroyers and other former Chinese Navy vessels.

 Headquarters: Beijing.
 North China Sea Fleet. Qingdao, Shandong.
 East China Sea Fleet. Pudong, Shanghai.
 South China Sea Fleet. Guangzhou, Guangdong.

Disestablishment
In March 2013, China announced it shall create a unified Coast Guard commanded by the State Oceanic Administration. The move has now merged China Marine Surveillance with the China Coast Guard.

North China Sea Fleet 

The North China Sea Fleet was led by both North China Sea Branch, State Oceanic Administration and China Marine Surveillance.

East China Sea Fleet 

The East China Sea Fleet was led by both East China Sea Branch, State Oceanic Administration and China Marine Surveillance.

South China Sea Fleet 

The South China Sea Fleet is led by both South China Sea Branch, State Oceanic Administration and China Marine Surveillance.

Deployments around Senkaku (Diaoyu) Islands 

According to the State Oceanic Administration, the following operations in the territorial waters around Senkaku Islands have been carried out by CMS, which is now known as China Coast Guard.

Deployments within the South China Sea

See also 

 Maritime law enforcement agencies in China
 People's Armed Police
 People's Liberation Army Navy

References 

 
Defunct law enforcement agencies of China
State Oceanic Administration
Paramilitary organizations based in China
Government agencies established in 1998
1998 establishments in China
Military units and formations disestablished in 2013